Eduardo Pinto de Jesus (born 17 March 2002), known as Eduardo or Eduardo Jesus, is a Brazilian professional footballer who plays for Botafogo B in the Campeonato Carioca.

Early life
Jesus developed at Vitória. In June 2019, he joined Palmeiras on loan. In February 2020, he went on loan to Fluminense. While with Fluminense's U20 side, he also played for their B team.

In April 2021, he signed with Bahia on a permanent contract, joining the U20 team.

Club career
In January 2022, Jesus signed a two-year contract with an option for a further year with Canadian Premier League side York United. On 7 April 2022, he made his professional debut for York, in a 1–0 loss to HFX Wanderers. In December 2022, Jesus' contract was terminated by mutual consent.

In January 2023, he returned to Brazil joining Botafogo B.

International career
In 2017, he played with the Brazil U15 at the 2017 South American U-15 Championship.

Jesus earned a cap with Brazil at the U-16 level, coming on at the end of an 8-1 friendly match victory against Cameroon. In 2018, he was called up by the Brazil U17 to participate in friendly matches in England, making five appearances.

References

External links

2002 births
Living people
Brazilian footballers
Association football defenders
Brazilian expatriate footballers
Expatriate soccer players in Canada
Brazilian expatriate sportspeople in Canada
Esporte Clube Vitória players
Sociedade Esportiva Palmeiras players
Fluminense FC players
Esporte Clube Bahia players
York United FC players
Canadian Premier League players
Brazil youth international footballers